Nina Allan (born 27 May 1966) is a British writer of speculative fiction. She has published four collections of short stories, a novella and three novels. Her stories have appeared in the magazines Interzone, Black Static and Crimewave and have been nominated for or won a number of awards, including the Grand Prix de l'Imaginaire and the British Science Fiction Association Award.

Allan was born in Whitechapel, in the East End of London, and grew up in the Midlands and in West Sussex. She studied Russian language and literature at the University of Reading and the University of Exeter, and then did an MLitt at Corpus Christi College, Oxford.

After leaving Oxford she worked as a buyer for an independent chain of record stores based in Exeter, and then as a bookseller in London. Her first published story appeared in the British Fantasy Society journal Dark Horizons in 2002. She lived in the Taw Valley area of North Devon but now lives on Isle of Bute.

Her column "Nina Allan's Time Pieces" appears in Interzone.

Short stories

Nina Allan's stories have appeared in various publications and six "Best of" collections:
Allan's story The Lammas Worm appeared in Strange Tales 3 edited by Rosalie Parker of Tartarus Press in 2010.  It was then selected by Ellen Datlow for The Best Horror of the Year: Volume Two. The story was re-printed as part of Stardust:The Ruby Castle Stories.
Her story Flying in the Face of God appeared in issue 227 of Interzone in 2010. It was then selected by Gardner Dozois to appear in The Year's Best Science Fiction: Twenty-Eighth Annual Collection.
The story The Silver Wind originally appeared in issue 233 of Interzone in 2011. It was reprinted in The Silver Wind and The Year’s Best Fantasy and Science Fiction 2012 edited by Rich Horton Prime Books. It was also short-listed for BSFA Awards for (short fiction) 2012.
 Her story Wilkolak appeared in issue 11 of Crimewave  edited by Andy Cox in 2011. It was selected by Maxim Jakubowski for The Mammoth Book of Best British Crime 10.  Constable & Robinson 2013.
Sunshine appeared in issue 29 of Black Static edited by Andy Cox in 2012. It was selected by Rich Horton for The Year’s Best Science Fiction and Fantasy 2013 Prime Books.
Her story The Tiger appeared in Terror Tales of London edited by Paul Finch (Gray Friar Press) in 2013. It was then selected by Ellen Datlow for The Best Horror of the Year: Volume Six.

She has said that all her short fiction to date has been, "a kind of apprenticeship in novel-writing". Her first novel is The Race, which uses the town of Hastings for its landscape, where she was living for most of the time she was writing it.

Nominations and awards
Allan's story Angelus won the Aeon Award in 2007. It was announced at the European Science Fiction Convention in Copenhagen, Denmark in September 2007. The Grand Judge Ian Watson commented that it was “beautifully written and paced and enigmatic yet in an entirely lucid way."

Her novella Spin won the British Science Fiction Association Award for Best Short Fiction for 2013.

The Silver Wind retitled Complications  won the French Grand Prix de l'Imaginaire for Foreign Short Fiction in 2014.

Her works were short-listed for the British Fantasy Award four times, and her novella The Gateway from Stardust was a finalist for Best Novella in the 2013 Shirley Jackson Awards.

The Race was nominated for the Red Tentacle Award for Best Novel of 2014 at the Kitschies. It was nominated for the British Fantasy Award for best novel of 2014. It was also nominated for the 2014 John W. Campbell Memorial Award for best science-fiction novel.

The Harlequin won the 2015 Novella Award.

The Rift won two awards, the 2017 British Science Fiction Association Award for Best Novel, and the 2017 Red Tentacle Award for Best Novel.

The Art of Space Travel was a finalist for the 2017 Hugo Award for Best Novelette.

Publications

Collections
A Thread of Truth, Eibonvale Press (2007),   Contains the stories "Amethyst", "Ryman's Suitcase", "Bird Songs at Eventide", "Queen South", "The Vicar with Seven Rigs", "Heroes", "Terminus" and "A Thread of Truth". 
The Silver Wind, Eibonvale Press (2011),   Contains the stories "Time's Chariot", "My Brother's Keeper", "The Silver Wind", "Rewind" and "Timelines: An Afterword". "Darkroom" added as the opening story, "Chambre noire", in the French edition of the collection, Complications. The Spanish edition, Máquinas del  Tiempo  keeps the original contents.
Microcosmos (Imaginings 5), NewCon Press (2013),   Contains the stories Microcosmos, The Phoney War, Chaconne, A. H., Orinoco, Flying in the Face of God and Higher Up.
Stardust: The Ruby Castle Stories, PS Publishing (2013),   Contains the stories "B-Side", "The Lammas Worm", "The Gateway", "Laburnums", "Stardust", "Wreck of the Julia" and the poem "Red Queen".  The stories Angelus, Flying in the Face of God and Stardust are connected as they all involve a Russian astrophysicist called Valery Kushnev.  Re-issued as Ruby, Titan Books (2020).

Novellas
Spin, The Third Alternative (TTA) Press, (2013) This is a modern re-imagining of the Arachne myth
The Harlequin Sandstone Press, (2015), .
The Art of Space Travel, Tor Books (e-book, 2016).

Novels
The Race, NewCon Press (2014),  Reissued by Titan Books (2016), .
The Rift, Titan Books (2017).
The Dollmaker, Riverrun (2019).

Short stories
"A Storm in Kingstown" in Out of the Ruins, edited by Preston Grassmann, Titan Books, (2021),

Critical reception
Allan's story Darkroom appeared in Subtle Edens: An Anthology of Slipstream Fiction edited by Allen Ashley Elastic Press in 2008. In a review of the collection Andy Hedgecock wrote that Nina Allan is developing into, "one of the finest stylists of modern genre fiction." He went on to say that very few writers had her talent to uncover, "the strange within the ordinary with such clarity and precision."

Paul Kincaid in reviewing The Silver Wind asks when a series of stories can turn into a novel. He wrote that this was when, "the congeries of stories tell us more than any individual stories can." He suggests that this has been achieved and outlines the links between the stories before concluding that the sum of the parts is greater than the individual stories. One of the links is the viewpoint character Martin who appears in different parallel realities.  Sofia Samatar however in her review questioned whether or not there is a danger in Allan's experiment of the emotional force being, "more likely to be lost than gained in the leaps between parallel realities."

In Peter Tennant's 2014 review of The Race he wrote that this was "one of the finest books" he had read that year, but also wrote that he did not know what it was about and could "only hazard guesses." Although a novel, it is, "four self-contained sections that form a greater whole." Sofia Samatar agrees that "The Race guards its secrets." She writes that, this is "a distancing novel about drawing in, a science fiction novel aware of its own artifice, a literary fiction impatient with mimesis."

In Stuart Conover’s 2017 review of The Rift he stated "There are a lot of fun concepts here and a fully crafted alien world which could easily have a completely separate tale told in. Actually, I'd love to Nina revisit this world without even mentioning Selena, Julie, or the events from this book and just have it as connective tissue."

References

British science fiction writers
Living people
1966 births
People from Whitechapel
British women novelists